Schrankia separatalis is a species of moth of the family Erebidae first described by Alfred Otto Herz in 1904. It is found in Korea and Japan.

The wingspan is 6.5–8 mm.

References

Moths described in 1904
Moths of Japan
Hypenodinae